Gardening Mama 2: Forest Friends (ガーデニングママ：ママと森のなかまたち Gādeningu Mama: Mama to Mori no Naka Ma-Tachi) is a gardening simulation-styled video game for the Nintendo 3DS which was released in Japan on September 26, 2013, in North America on April 29, 2014, in Europe on March 6, 2015, and in Australia a day later. It is also the sequel of the DS game Gardening Mama.

Gameplay
Players use the stylus as a gardening tool, allowing them to grow over 50 different types of plants. They may trade points for items and decorations for their garden and to acquire new activities, including multi-player ones featuring Mama's friends and family.

Development
Gardening Mama 2: Forest Friends was first announced for the Nintendo 3DS on June 6, 2013, with a release date of September 2013 for Japan.

On March 3, 2014, Majesco confirmed that Gardening Mama 2: Forest Friends would be released in North America in April 2014.

Reception

The game received "generally unfavorable reviews" according to video game review aggregator Metacritic.  In Japan, Famitsu gave it a score of two eights, one six, and one seven, for a total of 29 out of 40.

References

External links
Official Japanese website

2013 video games
Cooking Mama
Majesco Entertainment games
Nintendo games
Nintendo 3DS games
Nintendo 3DS eShop games
Nintendo 3DS-only games
Simulation video games
Video games about plants
Video games developed in Japan
Video games set in forests